The 2016–17 season was Carlisle United's 112th season in their history and their third consecutive season in League Two. The season covered the period from 1 July 2016 to 30 June 2017, with competitive matches played between August and May. Along with League Two, the club also participated in the FA Cup, League Cup and League Trophy. Carlisle finished sixth, thus qualifying for the play-offs, where they were beaten in the semi-finals by Exeter City, 6–5 on aggregate.

Squad statistics

{{Extended football squad player|no=6|nat=ENG|pos=DF|name=Mark Ellis (out on loan)" |7|0|1|0|2|0|2|0}}

 

                             

 

 
 

|}

Top scorers

Disciplinary recordNotes: The red card that Michael Raynes received in the Round 20 match against Luton Town was rescinded by the FA Appeal Board after the club appealed.

Transfers

Transfers in

Transfers out
 

Loans in

Loans out

Competitions

Pre-season friendlies
On 6 June 2016, Carlisle United announced their provisional pre-season schedule. Two matches were announced to be played behind closed doors. One match was against Queen of the South F.C. (Result: 2–3 loss)'' on 5 July 2016 and the other is against Bury F.C. on 26 July 2016.

League Two

League table

Results by matchday

Matches

Play-offs

FA Cup

As a League Two side, Carlisle entered the FA Cup draw at the first round stage.

League Cup
Carlisle United entered the competition at the first round stage. On 21 June 2016, the first round draw was made; Carlisle were drawn at home against Port Vale.

Checkatrade Trophy

Group D

Group Stage

Knock-out stages

References

Carlisle United F.C. seasons
Carlisle United